The Danube Bridge (also known as the Friendship Bridge; , Most na druzhbata or, more commonly, Дунав Mост, Dunav most;  or Podul de la Giurgiu) is a steel truss bridge over the Danube River connecting the Bulgarian bank to the south with the Romanian bank to the north and the cities of Ruse and Giurgiu respectively.
It is one of only two bridges connecting Romania and Bulgaria, the other one being the New Europe Bridge between the cities of Vidin and Calafat.

History

Decorations were designed by Bulgarian architect Georgi Ovcharov. The bridge has two decks; a two lane motorway and a railway. Sidewalks for pedestrians are also included. The central part of the bridge (85 m) is mobile and can be lifted for oversized boats passage. The maintenance of the mobile part is Romania's responsibility and is periodically checked. The bridge was constructed in two and a half years with the aid of the Soviet Union.

The Soviets named it the "Friendship Bridge", but, since the fall of the communist regimes in both countries, the bridge got the more functional name of "Danube Bridge".

Border control stations are present on the bridge, due to its serving as a border crossing between the two countries. Since January 2007 there is no more customs control and the passport/identity card control is done "on one desk" either by the Bulgarian or the Romanian border police, being an "internal border" within the European Union. Border control will be completely removed when Bulgaria and Romania join the Schengen Agreement.

On 3 September 2011 the Bulgarian part of the bridge was opened, after two months of rehabilitation.

There are a pair of rectangular towers supported by pillars on both ends.

Tolls
The following tolls apply for crossing the Danube Bridge:

Gallery

See also 
 European route E70
 European route E85
 DN5 road in Romania
 CFR Line 902 (Giurgiu – Bucharest) and CFR Line 903 (Giurgiu – Videle) in Romania
 Danube Bridge 2, another bridge connecting Bulgaria and Romania
 List of bridges in Bulgaria
 List of bridges in Romania

References

External links 

 Halfway down the Danube, a short story about crossing the bridge

Truss bridges
Bridges in Bulgaria
Bridges in Romania
Bridges over the Danube
Bridges completed in 1954
Buildings and structures in Ruse, Bulgaria
Giurgiu
International bridges
Bulgaria–Romania border crossings
Railway bridges in Bulgaria
Railway bridges in Romania
Road-rail bridges
Steel bridges
Buildings and structures in Giurgiu County
Bulgaria–Soviet Union relations
Romania–Soviet Union relations
Toll bridges
Bulgaria–Romania relations
Soviet foreign aid
European route E85
Double-decker bridges